The Ovidenia Armeni Church is a Romanian Orthodox church located at 3 Făgăraș Street in Focșani, Romania. It is dedicated to the Entry of the Theotokos into the Temple (popularly called Ovidenia).

The church dates to the end of the 18th century; construction appears to have lasted from 1789 to 1798. The ktetors are anonymous. It was once in the midst of an Armenian quarter. The church was seriously damaged and abandoned during World War I. After 1975, the communist authorities wished to demolish the ruins, but a priest convinced them to abandon the idea. The interior was painted from 1980 to 1985. The parish reopened in 1998.

The church is listed as a historic monument by Romania's Ministry of Culture and Religious Affairs.

Notes

Religious buildings and structures in Focșani
Historic monuments in Vrancea County
Romanian Orthodox churches in Vrancea County
Churches completed in 1798